Lewis William Riess (October 19, 1887 – January 4, 1946) was an American football, basketball, and baseball coach and college athletics administrator. He served as the head football coach at Hampden–Sydney College from 1908 to 1910 and at Virginia Agricultural and Mechanical College and Polytechnic Institute (VPI)—now known as Virginia Tech—in 1911, and Randolph–Macon College from 1912 to 1917, compiling a career college football record of 33–39–4. Riess was also the head basketball coach at Hampden–Sydney from 1908 to 1912, amassing a record of 3–6, and the head baseball coach at VPI in 1912, tallying a mark of 9–9.

Riess left Randolph–Macon in December 1917 to become the athletic director of a United States Army aviation camp in Jacksonville, Florida.  He served as the activity secretary of the Army-Navy YMCA in Honolulu from 1938 to 1941. He died on January 4, 1946, in Belgium.

Head coaching record

Football

References

External links
 

1887 births
1946 deaths
Basketball coaches from Pennsylvania
College men's basketball head coaches in the United States
Hampden–Sydney Tigers football coaches
Hampden–Sydney Tigers basketball coaches
Randolph–Macon Yellow Jackets athletic directors
Randolph–Macon Yellow Jackets football coaches
Virginia Tech Hokies athletic directors
Virginia Tech Hokies baseball coaches
Virginia Tech Hokies football coaches
Swarthmore College alumni
Sportspeople from Philadelphia